Rataniidae is a family of copepods belonging to the order Siphonostomatoida.

Genera:
 Ratania Giesbrecht, 1893

References

Copepods